is a 1998 Japanese video game in the Bomberman series released for the Sega Saturn and PlayStation. It is a strategy role playing game, in contrast to previous games.

Story 
The main character is King Bomber who rules over his kingdom. The objective of the game is to conquer all the pieces of the Bomber country. Eventually, you fight the main villain, Bagular, and his four henchmen.

Gameplay 
This is one of the earliest games in the Bomberman series to stray away from its party game roots and focus more on the single-player component. It is a turned based strategy RPG.

It features a Quest mode, and a Battle mode.

Release 
It was released for the Sega Saturn and Sony PlayStation on April 16, 1998. It is the third Bomberman game for the Sega Saturn, and the second for the PlayStation. It was never released outside of Japan. In 2016, a fan translation was released for the PlayStation version.

Reception 
Weekly Famitsu reviewed the PlayStation version of the game, giving it a score of 24 out of 40.

The UK Sega Saturn Magazine gave it a score of 81 out of 100.

Gamespot gave it a 5.8 out of 10 score.

References

External links
Hudson game page
Bomberman Wars

Japan-exclusive video games
1998 video games
Wars
PlayStation (console) games
Sega Saturn games
Multiplayer and single-player video games
Video games developed in Japan

Role-playing video games
Strategy video games
Hudson Soft games